Lahor is a village in the Balochistan province of Pakistan. It is located at 30°24'0N 68°47'0E with an altitude of 1313 metres (4311 feet).

References

Populated places in Balochistan, Pakistan